The 1981–82 Football League Group Cup was the first edition of the tournament that replaced the Anglo-Scottish Cup. It was won by Grimsby Town, who beat Wimbldeon 3–2 in the final at Blundell Park.

First round

Group A

Group B

Group C

Group D

Group E

Group F

Group G

Group H

Quarter-finals

Semi-finals

Final

Notes

References

Football League Group Cup
Full